Kristyn Swaffer (born 13 December 1975) is an Australian association footballer who played for Australian W-League team Adelaide United.

Swaffer was part of the Australia squad at the 1999 FIFA Women's World Cup in the United States.

References

External links

Adelaide United FC (A-League Women) players
A-League Women players
Australian women's soccer players
1999 FIFA Women's World Cup players
1975 births
Living people
Australia women's international soccer players
Women's association football defenders